Delaware is an unincorporated community in Logan County, Arkansas, United States. Delaware has a post office with ZIP code 72835.

References

Unincorporated communities in Logan County, Arkansas
Unincorporated communities in Arkansas
Arkansas populated places on the Arkansas River